Christianity is the dominant religion in Palau, although there is no state religion. Freedom of religion is enshrined in Palau's constitution, and both the government and general society respect this right in practice.

Demographics 

In the 2015 census, of the population of 13,300 people over 18, 46% are members of the Roman Catholic Church. Other Christian groups were  Evangelicals at 25%; Seventh-day Adventists at 6.5%; The Church of Jesus Christ of Latter-day Saints (Mormons) at 1.4%; Assembly of God at .9%; and Baptists at .7%. Modekngei, which embraces both animist and Christian beliefs and is unique to the country, has 6% of the population. Muslims made up about 4% of the population.  Other  which includes everyone not in the religions above as well as the non-religious were about 10% of the population.

There also is a primarily Filipino Catholic expatriate community of 6,800 persons. 

Additionally, about 0.8% of the population was estimated to be Buddhist in 2010 and 0.2% was reported to be practicing elements of Chinese folk religion alongside as well. 0.7% of the population in 2010 was estimated to be practicing the Baháʼí Faith and 0.1% practiced Hinduism. 2.4% identified as agnostic while a non-negligible amount, under 0.1% of the population identified as atheist.

History 
Since the arrival of Jesuit priests in the early 19th century, foreign missionaries have been active; some have been in the country for many years. During the Japanese mandate, Japanese Christian missions were heavily subsidized; Japan's native Buddhists were given a comparative pittance. Japanese rule brought Mahayana Buddhism and Shinto to Palau, with the syncretism of the two being the majority religion among Japanese settlers. However, following Japan's World War II defeat, the remaining Japanese largely converted to Christianity, while the remainder continued to observe Buddhism, but stopped practicing Shinto rites. The Seventh-day Adventist and Evangelical churches have missionaries teaching in their respective elementary and high schools. There are also approximately 400 Bengali Muslims in Palau, and recently a few Uyghurs detained in Guantanamo Bay were allowed to settle in the island nation. There are two mosques in Palau, one of which is located in Koror.

Religious freedom 
The constitution of Palau establishes the freedom of religion and prohibits the government from taking any action to infringe upon it. It also states that the country has no state religion.

Religious groups are required to register with the government as nonprofit organizations. Foreign missionaries are also required to apply for missionary permits from the Bureau of Immigration and Labor.

Religious instruction is prohibited in public schools, but religious groups are allowed to request government funds to run private schools.

According to US State Department reports, there have been no significant societal breaches of religious freedom in Palau.

See also
Roman Catholic Diocese of Caroline Islands
History of the Jews in Palau
The Church of Jesus Christ of Latter-day Saints in Palau

References